Joseph Antignac (29 July 1895 – 16 July 1976), was a French soldier and businessman who served as Commissioner-General for Jewish Affair under the Vichy government between May and August 1944.

Biography 
Joseph Antignac was born on 29 July 1895 in Bordeaux, France. Initially a soldier, he became the president of a wood-veneer and insulation company in Belgium in 1935. Fighting the Germans from 3 September 1939, he was demobilized in October 1940. A refugee in Périgueux after the Fall of France, Antignac lost his entire business in the German invasion of Belgium and decided to apply for a job in the Commissariat-General for Jewish Affair. In October 1941, he was appointed director of the Police for Jewish Affairs in Limoges.

In August 1942, he became director of the Investigation and Control Section (S.E.C.) for the Zone libre; then director of cabinet in the Commissariat-General for Jewish Affair from January 1943 to 1 April 1944. In April and May 1943, he wrote three reports to SS-Obersturmführer Heinz Röthke in which he denounced the hiding of foreign Jewish children by friends of Juliette Stern within the Union générale des israélites de France (UGIF, General Organization of Jews in France). 

As Charles du Paty de Clam, Commissioner-General for Jewish Affair, was accused of passivity and disinterest towards the aryanisation process, Joseph Antignac replaced him on 17 May 1944. Joseph Antignac tried to make all documents related to the organization disappear in August 1944 as the Allies were heading to Paris. Following the Liberation of the French capital on 19–25 August 1944, he was arrested on November 20, then interned in Nanterre. Suffering from tuberculosis, he asked for his release in the spring of 1945, which he would only obtain three years later.

Antignac was condemned to capital punishment on 9 July 1949 after he unsuccessfully tried to convince the judges he was not an anti-Semite and that he ignored the fate of Jews. His conviction was eventually commuted to hard labor and indignité nationale due to his poor health. He was granted amnesty in 1954 after ten years of internment; the rest of his life is unknown.
He died on 16 July 1976 in the Cochin Hospital in the 14th arrondissement of Paris.

References 

1895 births
Holocaust perpetrators in France
Date of death unknown
French politicians convicted of crimes